Kamensky District is an administrative and municipal district (raion), one of the twenty-seven in Penza Oblast, Russia. It is located in the western central part of the oblast. Its administrative center is the town of Kamenka. Population: 62,322 (2010 Census);  The population of Kamenka accounts for 63.5% of the district's total population.

References

Notes

Sources

Districts of Penza Oblast